Louis Dilman Merrill (April 1, 1912 – April 7, 1963) was an American actor, who worked primarily in radio from the 1930s through the 1950s.

Early life
Lou Merill was born on April 1, 1912, in Winnipeg, Manitoba, Canada., and moved to the United States when he was young. He acted in stock theater and little theater before going to radio.

Radio
Merrill began working in radio in 1928. He performed in Lux Radio Theater as a utility supporting player in nearly every broadcast from 1937 to 1939 (notably as Sleepy in Snow White and the Seven Dwarfs), and also served as an assistant director handling the crowd scenes during that time. He continued to work the show sporadically until 1953. His career in the 1930s also included roles in the children's Christmas series The Cinnamon Bear (as Santa Claus),  the crime drama Big Town (as various gangsters and a stand-in for Edward G. Robinson as Steve Wilson), the soap opera Those We Love (as con man  Ed Neely), and The Mickey Mouse Theater of the Air. He later worked for Arch Oboler on Arch Oboler's Plays and Lights Out. As related by Mr. Oboler on the Speaking of Radio show (1976), in one dramatic real-life confrontation, Mr. Oboler broke his hand on Mr. Merrill's jaw when the former became incensed over the latter's offensive attitude. A mutual respect resulted from the incident.

In 1941, he starred as the Nemo-like Captain Craig McKenzie in the now mostly lost sci-fi radio series Latitude Zero (on which the 1969 film of the same name is based). Tweelve years later, he starred on the true crime anthology drama series Crime Classics. Merrill played Thomas Hyland, the host and narrator who was fascinated with crime. Radio comedy appearances included Point Sublime (a regular as jeweler Aaron Saul) and Abbott and Costello (guesting as Santa Claus) and the Life of Riley as Punchy (a punch drunk ex-prize fighter).  He also appeared on Escape, The Man Called X, Suspense, NBC University Theater, On Stage, The CBS Radio Workshop, Rogue's Gallery, and The Six Shooter.

Merrill was the narrator for Retribution, a "psychological mystery series."

Film
Merrill first appeared in film with the 1935 Columbia Pictures production The Black Room; he played the Story Teller in Trailer, though he was left uncredited. His formal debut in movies came in the 1939 Universal Studios production Tropic Fury. He appeared sporadically in films throughout the next three decades, often in small roles along with several uncredited appearances.

Television
Merrill occasionally appeared on television, in episodes of such programs as Oboler Comedy Theater, The George Burns and Gracie Allen Show, I Love Lucy, The Lineup, Colt .45, Sugarfoot, The Millionaire, This Man Dawson, Shirley Temple's Storybook, Angel, and King of Diamonds.

Voiceover narration
In his later years, Merrill continued doing voice-over work, regularly doing film trailer narration work for American International Pictures.  Merrill narrated trailers for films such as It Conquered the World, I Was a Teenage Werewolf, War of the Colossal Beast, Teenage Cave Man, Night of the Blood Beast, A Bucket of Blood, Horrors of the Black Museum, The Angry Red Planet, Master of the World, and Burn, Witch, Burn.

Personal life and death
Merrill was married to actress Celeste Rush. They had two adopted daughters. Merrill died on April 7, 1963, in Los Angeles, California, aged 51. He is buried at Hollywood Forever Cemetery.

References

External links

1912 births
1963 deaths
20th-century American male actors
American male film actors
American male radio actors
American male television actors
American male voice actors
Burials at Hollywood Forever Cemetery
Canadian emigrants to the United States
Male actors from Winnipeg